Nepenthes platychila (from Greek for "flat-lipped") is a tropical pitcher plant endemic to the Hose Mountains of central Sarawak. It is notable for its smooth peristome and funnel-shaped upper pitchers. Nepenthes platychila belongs to the loosely defined "N. maxima complex", which also includes, among other species, N. boschiana, N. chaniana, N. epiphytica, N. eymae, N. faizaliana, N. fusca, N. klossii, N. maxima, N. stenophylla, and N. vogelii.

Nepenthes platychila was included in a 2002 report on the Nepenthes of the Hose Mountains under the placeholder name Nepenthes sp. 'B'.

Natural hybrids

 N. fusca × N. platychila

References

Further reading

 Clarke, C.M. & C.C. Lee 2004. Pitcher Plants of Sarawak. Natural History Publications (Borneo), Kota Kinabalu.
 Lee, C.C. 2002. Nepenthes species of the Hose Mountains in Sarawak, Borneo. [video] The 4th International Carnivorous Plant Conference, Tokyo, Japan. (video by Irmgard & Siegfried R. H. Hartmeyer)
 McPherson, S.R. & A. Robinson 2012. Field Guide to the Pitcher Plants of Borneo. Redfern Natural History Productions, Poole.
 Mey, F.S. 2014. Joined lecture on carnivorous plants of Borneo with Stewart McPherson. Strange Fruits: A Garden's Chronicle, February 21, 2014.

Carnivorous plants of Asia
platychila
Plants described in 2002